The Sky Fox, or Celestial Fox is a type of divine beast in East Asian mythology. After reaching 1,000 years of age and gaining its ninth tail, a fox spirit turns a golden color, becoming a sky fox, the most powerful form of the fox spirit, and then ascends to the heavens. With its new celestial form, it is able to see a thousand li ahead (c. 3927 km or 2440 miles).

History
The mythology of multi-tailed foxes originate from the beliefs of Ancient China. A collection of stories dating from the Jin dynasty known as Xuanzhongji (Simp. Chinese:玄中记) records:

"When a fox reaches the age of fifty, it is able to transform into a woman. At a hundred years old, a beauty or a female shaman, who knows about outside affairs a thousand li away. It's kindness and charm make people confused and demented. At a thousand years, the fox connects with the Sky and is transformed into the Sky Fox."

According to legend, It is said that there are three ways to make a fox open its mind and gain wisdom. 
The first is to swallow treasures by accident, such as the treasures of heaven and earth.
The second is for the fox to find a good place to cultivate its spiritual virtues (修行:Xiūxíng). As foxes are Yin, they need a lot of Yin Air (阴气) containing the essence of the moon in order to work at self improvement. Therefore, movies and TV shows sometimes portrays foxes worshiping the moon.
The third way for a fox to gain wisdom is to follow a Taoist monk or master to learn abilities. 

Every 100 years, a catastrophe occurs. It was believed that if a fox could go through it smoothly, it will grow a new tail. The number of nine-tailed foxes is small because many foxes unfortunately interrupted their practice of self-cultivation or died during the 3~5 tail period. When the fox reaches 1,000 years of age, it will become the Thousand-Year Heavenly Fox, formally gaining the Heavenly Court's canonization and obtaining the Immortal Rank.

In the Edo period of Japan, Tenko were considered to be of the highest rank of foxes, and in the essays "" and "", the foxes are ranked in the order of tenko, kūko, kiko, and then yako. Also, in the Nihon Shoki, in the 9th year of Emperor Jomei (637), the great shooting star was written as 天狗 (normally read "tengu") and was given the reading of "amatsu kitsune", and from this, the essay "Zen'an Zuihitsu" put forth the theory that tenko and tengu are the same creature.

In Ojika, Nagasaki, the tenko is a type of spirit possession, and it is said that those who are possessed by it have a divination ability that is always correct, and is thus a divine spiritual power.

See also
Inari Ōkami
Kitsune

References

Chinese legendary creatures
Japanese folklore
Mythological foxes
Kitsune (fox)